The Austin Baronetcy, of Red Hill in the parish of Castleford in the West Riding of the County of York, is a title in the Baronetage of the United Kingdom. It was created on 16 July 1894 for John Austin, Liberal member of parliament for Osgoldcross.

Austin baronets of Red Hill, Yorkshire (1894)
Sir John Austin, 1st Baronet (1824–1906)
Sir William Michael Byron Austin, 2nd Baronet (1871–1940)
Sir John Byron Fraser Austin, 3rd Baronet (1897–1981)
Sir William Ronald Austin, 4th Baronet (1900–1989)
Sir Michael Trescawen Austin, 5th Baronet (1927–1995)
Sir Anthony Leonard Austin, 6th Baronet (1930–2017)
Sir Peter John Austin, 7th Baronet (born 1958)

Notes

Baronetcies in the Baronetage of the United Kingdom
1894 establishments in the United Kingdom